Monday is the day of the week between Sunday and Tuesday.

Monday may also refer to:

Film and television
 "Monday" (The X-Files), a 1999 episode of the television series
 Monday (2000 film), a 2000 Japanese film
 Monday (2020 film), a 2020 American-British-Greek film

Music
 Monday (opera) (German: Montag), an opera by Karlheinz Stockhausen from his Licht cycle
 "Monday", a song by Matt Corby from Telluric (2016)
 "Monday", a song by Imagine Dragons from Mercury – Act 1 (2021)
 "Monday", a song by The Jam from Sound Affects (1980)
 "Monday", a song by Orbital from Orbital (1993)
 "Monday", a song by Sonny & Cher from In Case You're in Love (1967)
 "Monday", a song by Wilco from Being There (1996)

Places
 Monday, Missouri, an unincorporated community
 Monday, Ohio, an unincorporated community
 Monday Creek, a stream in Ohio
 Monday River, in Paraguay (unrelated etymology)
 Dushanbe, Tajikistan, which means Monday in Persian

Companies
 monday.com, a SaaS company

Other uses
 Monday (surname)
 Monday Magazine, a weekly newspaper in Victoria, British Columbia, Canada 
 Monday (play), a 2009 one-woman stage play by Gloria Idahota Williams
 Monday (software), task management software
 Miss Monday, a character from the 2014 video game Yaiba: Ninja Gaiden Z

See also
 Monday Monday (disambiguation)